Mātā Jīto (1673 – 5 December 1700, Gurmukhi: ਮਾਤਾ ਜੀਤੋ,) or Ajeet Kaur was the first wife of the tenth Sikh Guru, Guru Gobind Singh The couple married on 21 June 1677 and had three children together.

Mata Jito was the mother of Jujhar Singh, Zorawar Singh and Fateh Singh but was not the biological mother of Ajit Singh, who was the son of Mata Sundari.

See also
 Mata Sundari
 Mata Sahib Kaur
 Gurdwara Mata Sundri

References

1700 deaths
Family members of the Sikh gurus
Punjabi people
1673 births